Tangaroa (Takaroa in the South Island) is the great  of the sea, lakes, rivers, and creatures that live within them, especially fish, in Māori mythology. As Tangaroa-whakamau-tai he exercises control over the tides. He is sometimes depicted as a whale.

In some of the Cook Islands he has similar roles, though in Manihiki he is the fire deity that Māui steals from, which in Māori mythology is instead Mahuika, a goddess of fire.

Māori traditions 
Tangaroa is a son of Ranginui and Papatūānuku, Sky and Earth.

Tangaroa is the father of many sea creatures. Tangaroa's son, Punga, has two children, Ikatere, the ancestor of fish, and Tū-te-wehiwehi (or Tū-te-wanawana), the ancestor of reptiles. Terrified by Tāwhirimātea's onslaught, the fish seek shelter in the sea, and the reptiles in the forests.

The contention between Tangaroa and Tāne Mahuta, the father of birds, trees, and humans, is an indication that the Māori thought of the ocean and the land as opposed realms. When people go out to sea to fish or to travel, they are in effect representatives of Tāne Mahuta, entering the realm of Tāne Mahuta's enemy. For this reason, it was important that offerings were made to Tangaroa before any such expedition.

The Kāi Tahu version of the origin of Takaroa maintains that he is the son of Temoretu, and that Papatūānuku is his wife. Papatūānuku commits adultery with Rakinui while Takaroa is away, and in the resulting battle on the beach Takaroa's spear pierces Rakinui through both his thighs. Papatūānuku then marries Rakinui.
 
In another legend, Tangaroa marries Te Anu-matao (chilling cold). They are the parents of the  ‘of the fish class’, including Te Whata-uira-a-Tangawa, Te Whatukura, Poutini, and Te Pounamu.  In some versions, Tangaroa has a son, Tinirau, and nine daughters.

Cook Islands 
In Rarotonga, Tangaroa is the god of the sea and fertility. He is the most important of all the departmental gods. Carved figures made from wood carvings are very popular on the island today.
In Mangaia, Tangaroa is a child of Vatea (daylight) and Papa (foundation) and the younger twin brother of Rongo. Rongo and Tangaroa share food and fish: Tangaroa's share is everything that is red (the red taro, red fish and so on). Tangaroa is said to have yellow hair and when Mangaians first saw Europeans they thought they must be Tangaroa's children.
In Manihiki, Tangaroa is the origin of fire. Māui goes to him to obtain fire for humankind. Advised to reach Tangaroa's abode by taking the common path, he takes the forbidden path of death infuriating Tangaroa who tries to kick him to death. Māui manages to prevent that and insists that Tangaroa give him fire. Māui kills Tangaroa. When his parents are horrified, Māui uses incantations to bring him back to life.

Elsewhere 
Tangaloa is one of the oldest Polynesian deities and in western Polynesia (for example, Samoa and Tonga) traditions has the status of supreme creator god. In eastern Polynesian cultures Tangaroa is usually considered of equal status to Tāne and thus not supreme.

In Rapa Nui tradition Tangaroa was killed at Hotu-iti bay and was buried in the surrounding area.
In Ra'iātea a legend reported by Professor Friedrich Ratzel in 1896 gave a picture of his all-pervading power.
In the Marquesas Islands, the equivalent deities are Tana'oa or Taka'oa.
In Rennell and Bellona Islands (Polynesian cultures in the southern Solomon Islands)  Tangagoa is a sea god who stayed on the coastal cliff of east Rennell known as Toho, and flew in the night with a flame in the sky. Tangagoa was believed to take spirits of the dead, so when someone was near death, the sparkling fire would be seen at night. Some can still recall the time when this god appeared in the night as a flame in the sky, and have many tales of it. Tangagoa started to disappear in the 1970s and early 1980s when Christian missionaries visited the cliff and reportedly 'cast' him out.

A legendary figure named Tagaro also features in the Melanesian cultures of north-eastern Vanuatu.

Moriori 
In the mythology of the Moriori of the Chatham Islands, Tangaroa is a fish deity alongside Pou.

See also 

 Kanaloa, Hawaiian mythology
 RV Tangaroa, a New Zealand research vessel
 Ta'aroa, Tahitian mythology
 Tagaloa, Samoan mythology
 Tagroa Siria, Rotuman mythology
 Tangaloa (Tongan mythology)

References

Notes

Sources

External links 
 "Tangaroa" in Te Ara: The Encyclopedia of New Zealand

Cook Islands mythology
Sea and river gods
Māori gods